Teen Angel may refer to:

Film and TV
Teen Angel (1989 TV series), a 1989 drama starring Jason Priestley
Teen Angel (1997 TV series), a 1997 sitcom starring Corbin Allred
Teen Angel, a one-scene character in Grease (see "Beauty School Dropout")
Captain Caveman and the Teen Angels, a 1977 animated series starring Mel Blanc

Music
Teen Angels (American band), 1994–1996
Teen Angels, an Argentine pop music group

Songs
"Teen Angel" (song), song performed by Mark Dinning, written Red Surrey, Jean Surrey 1959
"Teen Angel", song by Dion and the Belmonts Singer, Patrick, Dimucci 1958
"Teen Angel", a song by Donovan, from The Hurdy Gurdy Man 1968

Comics
 Angel from the Time-displaced X-Men (called that way to set him apart from the adult character)